Clinton E. Adams is an osteopathic physician, former medical school dean at Western University of Health Sciences, and former president of Rocky Vista University.  He serves as a member of the board of directors at Accreditation Council for Graduate Medical Education. He served in the US Navy for 30 years, retiring as rear admiral.

Background and education 
Clinton E. Adams graduated from Baldwin Wallace College with a Bachelor of Science in chemistry.  He graduated from the Chicago College of Osteopathic Medicine in 1976.  Graduated from the University of Oklahoma with a Master of Public Administration.

He completed his medical internship at Undersea Medicine in Groton, Connecticut.  He completed a family medicine residency training at Naval Hospital in Charleston, South Carolina.

In 1989, Adams went to George Washington University in Washington, D.C., where he completed anesthesiology residency.

Adams completed a 30-year career as a U.S. Navy officer.  During that time, he achieved the title of rear admiral, and was the commander, CEO, of three naval hospitals, including Portsmouth Naval Regional Medical Center.

In 2005, Adams became dean of the College of Osteopathic Medicine of the Pacific (COMP) at Western University of Health Sciences.  He remained at WesternU for 11 years, serving as vice president of clinical affairs.  He was the founding dean of a new medical college campus in Oregon (COMP-NW).

In October 2015, Adams was appointed president of Rocky Vista University. He retired in June 2021.

References

Living people
Physicians from Illinois
American osteopathic physicians
United States Navy Medical Corps officers
United States Navy rear admirals (lower half)
Baldwin Wallace University alumni
University of Oklahoma alumni
Heads of universities and colleges in the United States
American health care chief executives
Chicago College of Osteopathic Medicine alumni
Year of birth missing (living people)